The Undertow  is a 1915 American short silent drama film, directed by Jack Harvey for the Thanhouser Company. It stars Ethel Jewett, Ernest C. Warde, and Bert Delaney.

References

External links

1915 films
American silent short films
Silent American drama films
1915 drama films
Films directed by Jack Harvey
Thanhouser Company films
1915 short films
American black-and-white films
1910s American films